Karskaya railway station, at the end of the extension of the Obskaya–Bovanenkovo Line, in Russia, is the most northerly railway station in the world.

The line to Karskaya, a town inside the Arctic Circle known for natural gas extraction, was completed by Gasprom in February 2011.

References 

Railway stations in Yamalo-Nenets Autonomous Okrug
Railway stations in Russia opened in 2011